Hesperilla donnysa, also known as the donnysa skipper or varied sedge skipper, is a species of butterfly in the family Hesperiidae. It is found in the Australian Capital Territory, New South Wales, Queensland, South Australia, Tasmania, Victoria and Western Australia.

The wingspan is about 30 mm for males and 35 mm for females.

The larvae feed on various sword grass species, including Gahnia sieberiana. Other recorded food plants include Gahnia decomposita, Gahnia aspera, Gahnia clarkei, Gahnia deusta, Gahnia erythrocarpa, Gahnia filifolia, Gahnia grandis, Gahnia lanigera, Gahnia microstachya, Gahnia radula, Gahnia subaequiglumis and Gahnia trifida.

Subspecies
Hesperilla donnysa galena (around Geraldton, Western Australia)
Hesperilla donnysa albina (south-western Western Australia)
Hesperilla donnysa aurantia (Tasmania and local islands)
Hesperilla donnysa donnysa (Australian Capital Territory, New South Wales, Queensland, South Australia, Tasmania, Victoria)
Synonyms:
Hesperilla donnysa diluta
Hesperilla donnysa icaria
Hesperilla donnysa patmos
Hesperilla donnysa samos
Hesperilla donnysa delos

External links
Australian Insects
Australian Faunal Directory

Trapezitinae
Butterflies described in 1868
Butterflies of Australia
Taxa named by William Chapman Hewitson